Phiala bergeri is a moth in the family Eupterotidae. It was described by Rougeot in 1975. It is found in Ethiopia.

References

Moths described in 1975
Eupterotinae